Yukarıçamlı can refer to the following villages in Turkey:

 Yukarıçamlı, Bigadiç
 Yukarıçamlı, Bolu
 Yukarıçamlı, Oltu